David Burt (born 1953) was a British actor.

David Burt may also refer to:

 David Burt (cricketer) (born 1901), New Zealand cricketer
 David Burt (filtering advocate)
 David Raitt Robertson Burt (1899–1983), Scottish zoologist
 Edward David Burt (born 1979), Bermudan politician